Jiangsu Rudong Senior High School (Rudong County, Nantong, Jiangsu) is a high school founded in 1938. It is a state-level senior high school which located in the Yangtze River Delta.

References

Education in Jiangsu
Educational institutions established in 1938
1938 establishments in China